Heliodorus Emesenus or Heliodorus of Emesa is the author of the ancient Greek novel called the Aethiopica or Theagenes and Chariclea, which has been dated to the 220s or 370s AD.

Identification
He identifies himself at the end of his work as

According to Tim Whitmarsh, 'from the race of the sun' "looks like a claim to hereditary priesthood," though "uncertainties" remain. According to The Cambridge History of Classical Literature, "the personal link here established between the writer and Helios has also a literary purpose, as has Calasiris' flashback narrative" .
The later tradition maintaining that Heliodorus had become a Christian bishop is likely fictional.

Quoting Richard L. Hunter,

See also
 Emesene dynasty
Other ancient Greek novelists:
 Chariton – The Loves of Chaereas and Callirhoe
 Xenophon of Ephesus – The Ephesian Tale
 Achilles Tatius – Leucippe and Clitophon
 Longus – Daphnis and Chloe

Notes

References

 
Heliodoros, Aithiopika, ed. Robert Mantle Rattenbury, Thomas Wallace Lumb (Paris: Les Belles Lettres, three volumes, 1935–1943)

External links
 
 Aethiopica (English translation) at Elfinspell

3rd-century novelists
4th-century novelists
Ancient Greek novelists
People from Homs
Year of birth unknown
Year of death unknown
3rd-century people